Monte Sarmiento is a container ship owned and operated by Aliança Navegação, a subsidiary of A.P. Moller Singapore Pte. Originally owned by Santa Containerschiffe GmbH, a subsidiary of Hamburg Süd, she has had four owners and been registered under three flags.

The vessel is one of ten ships of the Monte class built for Hamburg Süd by Daewoo Shipbuilding & Marine Engineering and Daewoo Mangalia Heavy Industries between 2004 and 2009.

Construction
Monte Sarmiento had its keel laid down on 27 December 2004 at Daewoo Shipbuilding & Marine Engineering in Okpo, South Korea.

The ship's gross tonnage, a measure of the volume of all its enclosed spaces, is 69,132. Its net tonnage, which measures the volume of the cargo spaces, is 34,823.

The vessel was built with a Wartsila Nederland B.V. 8RTA96C main engine, which drives a controllable-pitch propeller. The 8-cylinder engine has a Maximum Continuous Rating of 45,760 kW with 102 revolutions per minute at MCR. The cylinder bore is 960mm. The vessel's steam piping system features an Aalborg CH 8-500 auxiliary boiler.

Construction of the ship was completed on 2 June 2005.  The ship is classified by the ABS with the code "A1, Container Carrier, AMS, ACCU; RRDA, BWE, UWILD, PMP", meaning that it was constructed under the supervision of a recognized classification society, that the construction complies with the society's rules, and that it is classed as a general cargo carrier and container ship.

Notes

Merchant ships
2005 ships